The 2020 European Boxing Olympic Qualification Tournament for boxing at the 2020 Summer Olympics began on 14 March 2020 at the Copper Box Arena in London. On 16 March, the tournament was suspended and postponed due to the COVID-19 pandemic. It was to resume on 22 April 2021 and end on 26 April, but after cases rose in the United Kingdom in January, it was moved from London and further postponed. It was expected spectators were not allowed to attend.

Medalists

Men

Women

Qualification summary

Results

Men

Flyweight (52 kg)
Seeds

Featherweight (57 kg)
Seeds

Top half

Bottom half

Final

Lightweight (63 kg)
Seeds

Top half

Bottom half

Final

Welterweight (69 kg)
Seeds

Top half

Bottom half

Finals

Middleweight (75 kg)
Seeds

Top half

Bottom half

Finals

Light heavyweight (81 kg)
Seeds

Top half

Bottom half

Finals

Heavyweight (91 kg)
Seeds

Top half

Bottom half

Final

Super heavyweight (+91 kg)
Seeds

Women

Flyweight (51 kg)
Seeds

Featherweight (57 kg)
Seeds

Lightweight (60 kg)
Seeds

Welterweight (69 kg)
Seeds

Middleweight (75 kg)
Seeds

References

Boxing qualification for the 2020 Summer Olympics
International boxing competitions hosted by France
International boxing competitions hosted by the United Kingdom
European Boxing Olympic Qualification Tournament
European Boxing Olympic Qualification Tournament
European Boxing Olympic Qualification Tournament
European Boxing Olympic Qualification Tournament
European Boxing Olympic Qualification Tournament
European Boxing Olympic Qualification Tournament
European Boxing
European Boxing